Francis Childs (1763–1830) was an American publisher and printer of The New York Daily Advertiser, founded on Thursday, March 1, 1785, who went on to be one of the printers for the newly established United States government. Childs, together with John Swaine, both established printers in New York City, printerd the laws of the United States, beginning in 1789 shortly after the Constitution was ratified. They also published several works of the first Congress which met in 1791, in New York City.

Printing career

Childs was the printer and publisher of The New York Daily Advertiser, the third daily newspaper paper to appear in the United States. Its first issue was published on Thursday, March 1, 1785 with its final issue appearing on August 30, 1806. Since it was an independent upstart newspaper it realized a low subscription rate in its early days and attracted few advertisers. In an earnest effort to attract more advertising, Childs sold advertising space at the low rate of three shillings per ad. During the ratification debates over the proposed United States Constitution in 1788 and 1789, The New York Daily Advertiser featured  essays, which came to be known as The Federalist Papers, in support of that constitution.

In a letter from Alexander Hamilton to Francis Childs' and The New York Daily Advertiser, dated July 12, 1787, Hamilton pointedly criticized New York Governor George Clinton for his opposition to the ratification of the proposed United States Constitution. On September 15, 1787, Hamilton again wrote to The New York Daily Advertiser in regards to a defense of Clinton which appeared in the July 21 issue of The Advertiser and the September 6 issue of  The New-York Journal, and Weekly Register, where he continued his criticism of Governor Clinton. In this letter Hamilton referred to himself in the third person, but left instructions to Childs to reveal his name to anyone making inquiries as to the letter's author on behalf of the governor. Revolutionary poet  Philip Freneau wrote political editorials for The New York Daily Advertiser, even though he was not its editor and an anti-federalist.

In the 1780s before Childs began printing for the government, he worked with Benjamin Franklin in Philadelphia helping him set up his national network of printers.

Official government printer

After ratification of the United States Constitution on June 21, 1788 the competition over the public printing contract for  the newly established government became stringent among the leading  printers in New York. Along with Childs, there was Samuel Loudon, Thomas Greenleaf, Archibald McLean, and John Fenno who all submitted applications for this important contract. Childs and Swaine submitted a joint petition to the House of representatives on May 15, 1789 and were awarded the contract. On June 9, 1789, Childs and Swaine jointly addressed Samuel Allyne Otis, Secretary of the United States Senate, and John J. Beckley, Librarian of the United States Congress, as follows: "We will engage to print the Laws of Congress on the following terms": "For every sheet of letter press, including six hundred copies, two dollars and a half," "The paper to be furnished at the expense of the United States". The Secretary of the Senate and the Clerk of the House signed an agreement on June 29 that Childs and Swaine were to be jointly employed in the printing of the Laws of Congress. On July 2 Childs and Swaine were also commissioned "to print the laws of the United States until further order of Government". Their printing contract with the government was promptly announced in the July 3 issue of their newspaper, The New York Daily Advertiser: ""Gentlemen who wish to be supplied with copies of the Laws of the United States, are requested to make their application to Francis Childs and John Swaine, printers in New York, who are entrusted, by Congress, with the printing of the same". The price of the laws was set at one dollar. The laws were to be printed on "fine paper and a new type".

Legal works printed
 Journal of the House of Representatives of the United States, 1789
 Laws passed in the Territory of the United States North-West of the River Ohio, 1791
 Report of the Secretary of State, on the subject of the cod and whale fisheries
 Report of the committee appointed to examine into the state of the Treasury Department, 1794
 An act providing for the relief of such of the inhabitants of Saint Domingo, resident within the United States, 1794
 An act for the remission of the duties arising on the tonnage of sundry French vessels which have taken refuge in the ports of the United States, 1794

See also
 List of early American publishers and printers
 History of American newspapers
 History of printing
 History of journalism

Citations

Bibliography

 

 

 

 

 

 

  ( Alternative publication )

  

  

  

  

 

 

 

 

 

 

Colonial American printers
American print editors
1763 births
1830 deaths